Marko Elsner (11 April 196018 May 2020) was a Slovenian professional footballer who played as a defender.

Club career
Born in Ljubljana, capital of SR Slovenia (then part of Yugoslavia), Elsner played for Wacker Innsbruck's youth team before returning to Ljubljana where he played with Slovan before joining Olimpija in 1977. In 1983 he was signed by Red Star Belgrade, where he stayed for four seasons. In this period he became a national team player as he was part of the Yugoslav team at the 1984 Olympics, and has won one Yugoslav championship and one Yugoslav Cup during his spell with Red Star.

In 1987, he left Belgrade and moved abroad by signing with French Ligue 1 side OGC Nice. He played with Nice until 1993, except in 1990–91, when he played for the Austrian Bundesliga side Admira Wacker.

International career
Elsner played 14 games for the Yugoslavia national team between 1984 and 1988.  After the independence of Slovenia, he made his debut for the Slovenia national team against Cyprus on 18 November 1992. His last match was against Estonia, a friendly on 7 April 1993, and the two games were his only two appearances for Slovenia.

Personal life
Elsner's father, Branko Elsner, was also a footballer and later a coach. His sons Luka and Rok are also former professional footballers.

Elsner died on 18 May 2020 at the age of 60 due to illness.

Honours
Red Star Belgrade
Yugoslav First League: 1983–84
Yugoslav Cup: 1985

Yugoslavia national team
Olympic Games: 1984 (bronze)

References

1960 births
2020 deaths
Footballers from Ljubljana
Slovenian footballers
Slovenian expatriate footballers
Yugoslav footballers
Yugoslav expatriate footballers
Association football defenders
Yugoslav First League players
Ligue 1 players
Ligue 2 players
Austrian Football Bundesliga players
NK Olimpija Ljubljana (1945–2005) players
Red Star Belgrade footballers
OGC Nice players
FC Admira Wacker Mödling players
Yugoslav expatriate sportspeople in Austria
Yugoslav expatriate sportspeople in France
Slovenian expatriate sportspeople in France
Expatriate footballers in Austria
Expatriate footballers in France
Olympic footballers of Yugoslavia
Olympic bronze medalists for Yugoslavia
Footballers at the 1984 Summer Olympics
UEFA Euro 1984 players
Dual internationalists (football)
Olympic medalists in football
Yugoslavia international footballers
Slovenia international footballers
Medalists at the 1984 Summer Olympics
Elsner family